A vantage loaf (first recorded in 1612) is the thirteenth loaf of a baker's dozen.—a loaf of bread which is to the buyer's advantage, being in addition to the number ordered. The 13th-century English law governing trade in bread and ale, known as the Assize of Bread and Ale, imposed severe punishment for short measure. This could be a fine, destruction of the baker's oven, or even the pillory. To protect themselves, bakers would add a small piece of bread to each order, called the "in-bread", to ensure they could not be accused of short measure. For large orders of 12 loaves, this would be a whole extra loaf. In years of good harvest a baker could be making more bread than could be sold from the shop. Extra bread was sold on to middlemen or "hucksters", who would sell it in the streets. Since the price of bread was fixed by law, a huckster would make a profit by selling on the extra 13th loaf, which was the vantage loaf.

References 

Breads